The Jauhar Institute of Engineering and Technology, formerly Jauhar College of Engineering and Technology is a private engineering college in Rampur, Uttar Pradesh, India. Established by Mohammed Ali Jauhar Trust under the Self Financing Scheme of the Government of India. In past it was affiliated to Mahamaya Technical University, Noida till 2014 and now affiliated and part of Mohammad Ali Jauhar University. It is situated in the university premises.

History 

This engineering college was the part of Mohammad Ali Jauhar University the  pet project of Azam Khan the MLA of Rampur. But amidst stiff opposition from the ruling party the university was delayed and the engineering college was given approval.

Courses 

 B.Tech

References

External links 
 

Private engineering colleges in Uttar Pradesh
Universities and colleges in Rampur, Uttar Pradesh
Educational institutions established in 2010
2010 establishments in Uttar Pradesh